Nazario Araújo (born 25 May 1945) is an Argentine long-distance runner. He competed in the marathon at the 1972 Summer Olympics.

References

External links

1945 births
Living people
Athletes (track and field) at the 1972 Summer Olympics
Argentine male long-distance runners
Argentine male marathon runners
Olympic athletes of Argentina
Place of birth missing (living people)